Southern Samity is an Indian professional football club from Kolkata which was founded in 1945, and is also based in Siliguri in North Bengal. During that time, apart from sports they are also involved in various cultural activities. The club competes in the Calcutta Football League premiere division A, and has previously participated in the I-League 2nd Division, then second tier of Indian football league system.

History

Formation and journey
Southern Samity was founded in the city of Kolkata in 1945, during the British rule in India. During that time they were involved in various sporting and cultural activities. In 1959, the club got their affiliation from the Indian Football Association (IFA), but the club got their footsteps in Indian football long after their foundation. From 2007 to 2008 onwards, Frontlink International took charge of the club's football department, which boosted the growth highly.

Present years
In the year of 2008–09, they emerged as the champions of Calcutta Premier Division B and were promoted to the Calcutta Premier Division A. In 2011, Southern Samity created history as they became the first club after Behala Youth in 1975 to reach the prestigious IFA Shield semi-final on debut. In 2011–12 CFL season, the club was managed by Shabbir Ali. They also reached to the quarter-final of the 2012 IFA Shield. Southern Samity participated in the 2013 I-League 2nd Division and moved to the final round, where they achieved sixth position. In 2015, they played in the Calcutta Premier Division Group A.

In 2016, Southern Samity appointed Amit Sen as their new head coach and participated in the 2016–17 I-League 2nd Division, where they achieved success and qualified for the Final Round. They finished the season as runners-up with 17 points from 10 matches, behind champions NEROCA FC.

In 2020, Southern Samity reached the quarter-finals of the IFA Shield before losing 0–1 to I-League side Real Kashmir. Besides football, the club along with state football governing body IFA, and Kalighat MS have joined the fight against COVID-19 pandemic in West Bengal from May 2021 by providing free vaccinations to people.

On 1 July 2021, Southern Samity appointed Biswajit Bhattacharya as their new head coach. The club then roped in Ugandan trio Hamdan Nsubuga, Peter Mutebi and Habib Kavuma. They began their 2021–22 Calcutta Premier Division campaign with a 3–0 defeat against Mohammedan Sporting. On 23 August, Southern Samity was deducted six points by IFA and also handed two losses which includes their forfeited match against United Sports, and were relegated to the Premier Division B.

Stadium

Southern Samity used Rabindra Sarobar Stadium in Lake Gardens, Kolkata, as their home ground for matches of both the I-League 2nd Division and Calcutta Football League. Opened in 1961, the stadium is also known as Lake Stadium and has a capacity of 22,000 spectators.

Kit manufacturers and shirt sponsors

Players

Current squad

Team management

Past internationals

The players below had senior international cap(s) for their respective countries. Players whose name is listed, represented their countries before or after playing for Southern Samity.

  Alfred Ndyenge (2011–2012)
 Matthew Mayora (2012)
 Sherwin Emmanuel (2012–2013)
 Teah Dennis Jr. (2017–2018)
 Victor Kamhuka (2017, 2021–)
 Mahmoud Al Amnah (2019–2020)
 Habib Kavuma (2022–)

Honours

League
I-League 2nd Division
Runners-up (1): 2016–17
Calcutta Premier Division B
Champions (1): 2009
Runners-up (1): 2018–19
CFL Second Division
Champions (1): 2007–08

Cup
Kalinga Cup
Champions (1): 2013
Naihati Gold Cup
Champions (1): 2021
 Darjeeling Gold Cup
 Runners-up (1): 2010

Women

 Calcutta Women's Football League
 Runners-up (1): 2021–22

Other departments

Southern Samity Women
The club has its women's football section, that competes in the Calcutta Women's Football League. In the 2021–22 season, they achieved success with second-place finish.

See also

 List of football clubs in Kolkata
 Football in Kolkata

References

Further reading

External links
 Southern Samity club profile and results at Soccerway
Southern Samity at Everything For Football
 
 
 

Southern Samity
Association football clubs established in 1945
I-League 2nd Division clubs
Sports clubs in India
1945 establishments in India
Football clubs in Kolkata